(Protection Force) was the official name of the colonial troops in the African territories of the German colonial empire from the late 19th century to 1918. Similar to other colonial armies, the  consisted of volunteer European commissioned and non-commissioned officers, medical and veterinary officers. Most enlisted ranks were recruited from indigenous communities within the German colonies or from elsewhere in Africa.

Control of the German colonies of New Guinea, in Samoa, and in Togoland was performed by small local police detachments. Kiautschou in China under Imperial Navy administration was a notable exception. As part of the East Asian Station the navy garrisoned Tsingtao with the marines of  III, the only all-German unit with permanent status in an overseas protectorate.

Deployment

The name of the German colonial force dates back to the parlance of Chancellor Otto von Bismarck, who had the term , "protectorates", used instead of colonies.  contingents arose from local police forces or private paramilitary units, where German colonizers met with stronger resistance.

When in 1888 the Abushiri Revolt broke out in the dominions of the German East Africa Company, Bismarck's government in Berlin had to send mercenary troops under  Hermann Wissmann to subdue the uprising.

 formations under the supreme command of the German Emperor were organizationally never a part of the Imperial German Army, though German military law and discipline applied to its units. Initially supervised by the Imperial Navy Office, they were under the authority of the Colonial Department in the German Foreign Office by the act of 7 and 18 July 1896. In 1907 the Colonial Department with the  command was set up as the independent Imperial Colonial Office agency directly answerable to the Chancellor of Germany.

In 1896 a central  command was established as part of the Colonial Department. Despite its name, this agency exercised no military leadership but served as an administrative authority. It was located at Berlin’s Mauerstrasse, in proximity to the Colonial Office. At the beginning of the First World War in 1914, there were three  military commands, one in each of the German colonial regions in East Africa, South-West Africa, and in Kamerun, subordinate to each governor.

German East Africa
See also East African Campaign (World War I)

Including carriers and labourers, the force had about 14,000 personnel. On 13 April 1914, Lieutenant Colonel Paul Emil von Lettow-Vorbeck assumed command in German East Africa. The  in East Africa became the last German formation to surrender – days after the armistice in November 1918.

A pre-war company consisted of 160 (expandable to 200) men in three platoons of 50 to 60 men each, including two machine-gun teams. Each of the 14 companies also had a minimum 250 man carrier contingent as well as native irregulars known as Ruga-Ruga, called Fita-Fita in German Samoa, of approximately the same size units.
 1st Company (: Arusha/Neu Moshi
 2nd Company: Iringa and Unbena
 3rd Company: Lindi
 4th Company: Kilimatinde and Singida
 5th Company: Massoko
 6th Company: Udjidiji and Kassulo
 7th Company: Bukoba, Ussuwi and Kifumbiro
 8th Company: Tabora
 9th Company: Usumbura
 10th Company: Dar es Salaam
 11th Company: Kissenji and Mruhengeri
 12th Company: Mahenge
 13th Company: Kondoa Irangi
 14th Company: Muansa and Ikoma

The Dar es Salaam garrison further included a recruitment depot, a signals department and quartermaster unit.

Overall strength was 300 European recruits and 2,472 Africans, specifically 68 combatant officers, 60 warrant officers and NCOs, 132 non-combatant medical officers, civilian administrators, ammunition technicians, and 2 African officers and 184 African NCOs and 2,286 .

During the First World War, companies numbered 15 through 30 were added, plus eight (A through G, and L) temporary companies; and 1st through 8th  [rifle companies]. The  were originally composed of white settlers, their sons, plantations administrators and trading company employees but some units became racially mixed as the war dragged on. Numerous other small detachments were also formed. Several, possibly four, Reserve  were also raised consisting of older , they were prefixed by the letter "R".

German Southwest Africa

The  in German Southwest Africa was structured in 12 companies of mounted infantry totalling 1,500 men, primarily Germans. The 7th Company, stationed in the northern desert area of the colony, was mounted on imported camels. A single unit, called the Baster Company, consisting of non-local biracial white European-black Africans, was raised and deployed. Relations between the German administration and the natives in this colony had deteriorated to the point that few local Africans were recruited. Some Boers and Afrikaners were able to be recruited, bolstering the fledgling force.

The colonial forces for German Southwest Africa consisted of volunteers from the imperial army and navy (including some Austrians) but essentially consisted of members of German regiments. Before their deployment to Africa these troops were prepared for their special tasks and future environment. Such a training base was at Karlsruhe. Because of the often humid conditions in the upper Rhine valley of the grand-duchy of Baden, the area provided some early acclimatisation.

The structure of the Southwest African forces was as follows:

German Southwest Africa Command at Windhuk (modern Windhoek) consisted of headquarters, administration and legal (judge advocate), medical corps, surveying and mapping units.

Northern district command: Windhuk
 1st Company: Regenstein, Seeis
 4th Company: Okanjande
 6th Company: Outjo and Otavi
 2nd Battery: Johann-Albrechts-Höhe
 Transport platoon 1: Karibib
 Office for provisions: Karibib
 Horse depot: Okawayo
 Artillery and train depot: Windhuk
 Military hospital and medical depot: Windhuk
 Clothing depot: Windhuk
 Local headquarters: Windhuk
 Local headquarters and quartermaster: Swakopmund
Southern district command: Keetmanshoop
 2nd Company: Ukamas
 3rd Company: Kanus
 5th Company: Chamis and Churutabis
 7th and 8th Company (camel cavalry), military hospital: Gochas and Arahoab
 1st Battery: Narubis
 3rd Battery: Gibeon
 Transport platoon 2: Keetmanshoop
 Artillery and train depot: Keetmanshoop
 Military hospital and medical depot: Keetmanshoop
 Clothing depot: Keetmanshoop
 Office for provisions: Keetmanshoop
 Garrison administration: Keetmanshoop
 Horse depot: Aus
 Camel stud farm: Kalkfontain
 Local headquarters and quartermaster: Lüderitz

At the outbreak of the war the force had a total strength of 91 officers, 22 physicians, 9 veterinarians, 59 civilian administrators, ammunition technicians, 342 NCOs and 1,444 German other ranks for a total of 1,967 personnel.

German West Africa

Kamerun

German West Africa encompassed two colonial entities, Kamerun and Togoland.

The Kamerun force in 1914 consisted of 12 companies, totalling 1,600 men with headquarters at Soppo and established in 1894 from the existing police force (formed in 1891).

The structure of the Kamerun forces was as follows:

Central Command: Soppo near the capital Buea
 1st Company (headquarters company) and artillery detachment: Duala
 2nd Company: Bamenda, Wum and Kentu
 3rd Company: Mora and Kusseri
 4th Company: (expedition/survey company): Soppo
 5th Company: Buar, Carnot and Ebolowa
 6th Company: Mbaiki, Nola and Nguku
 7th Company: Garua, Marua, Mubi
 8th Company: Ngaundere
 9th Company: Dume and Baturi
 10th Company: Ojem and Mimwoul
 11th Company: Akoafim and Minkebe
 12th Company: Bumo, Fianga, and Gore
The companies were assigned to 49 garrisons in Kamerun and consisted of 61 officers, 23 physicians, 23 civilian administrators, ammunition technicians, 98 German NCOs and 1,650 African enlisted ranks for a total personnel count of 1,855.

Togoland
Togoland had a total police force of 673 personnel deployed throughout the colony. Approximately 1,000 troops were raised after the outbreak of the war. With very little arms, ammunition, or provisions, by the end of August 1914, all units had surrendered to French and British forces.

Appearance

When the Schutztruppe for German East Africa was founded in 1891, special uniforms were created which, among other things, were intended to underline the special position of the Schutztruppe as an independent part of the Reichsheer. The uniforms corresponded to the cut of the Prussian Army, initially in grey but later in "field gray" for home service  ("Tuchuniform"/"Tuchrock") or khaki ("Feldrock") for the tropics. Schutztruppen in Southwest Africa could wear the home service uniform in the protectorate. A white dress uniform was also worn by European officers and NCO's for ceremonial occasions. The white and khaki uniforms were cut the same. The Schutztruppe arm of service color was blue so their uniforms were trimmed blue down the trousers seam, the fly of their four-pocket tunic, collar edge, plus NCO's wore silver on blue inverted chevrons on the left sleeve only They were also supplied a grey or khaki slouch hat called the Schutztruppenhut (aka Südwester) on which the edge of the hat and the cap band were in the color of the respective Schutztruppe. The protectorate colours were as follows; German East Africa white, Cameroon dark red, German South West Africa cornflower blue, Togo yellow, German New Guinea green, German Samoa light pink. Additionally, as Imperial Troops, the 'Reichskokarde' cockade in black, white and red was worn on the folded brim of the Schutztruppenhut, a black, white and red cord could be worn around the tropical helmet (Tropenhelm), and black, white and red intertwined shoulder straps were worn on both tunic shoulders.

African personnel wore a pocketless cotton khaki tunic and breeches with blue puttees and ankle boots, which replaced bare lower legs and feet. African personnel also wore a red fez over which a khaki cover could be worn in the field. Company numbers were often worn on the front of the fez. In field conditions the askari wore either a khaki cover over their red fez or a khaki tarbush consisting os a khaki cloth over a wicker frame. Later in the war African troops wore a large floppy hat en lieu of the fez. The arm of service color for African/native troops was red so their uniforms, when trimmed, were trimmed red down the trousers seam, the tunic fly, collar edge, plus NCO's wore red, later brown, chevrons on the left sleeve only.

Uniforms and rank insignia
The rank insignia of Africans differed by one chevron from German ranks (eg. a German Gefreiter wore no chevrons, an African wore one, a German Unteroffizier wore one chevron, and African wore two etc). Despite them having nominally similar ranks, European NCOs always outranked Native NCOs.

German/European Ranks: Standard Imperial Army collar and or shoulder rank insignia was worn by German/European Officers and men.

German East Africa
Many of the original East African Askaris were Sudanese therefore the East African Schutztruppen utilized existing Turkish rank titles. The following ranks existed for East African other ranks:
 Effendi - Sudanese officers (East Africa only) inherited from the Wissmann-Truppe - originally wore one to three, but later only three, silver stars on the shoulder straps
 Senior Sergeant - Feldwebel/Sol - four flat-topped inverted chevrons
 Sergeant - Sargenten/Bet Schausch - three flat-topped inverted chevrons
 Corporal - Unteroffizier/Schausch - two flat-topped inverted chevrons
 Private - Gefreiter/Ombascha - one flat-topped inverted chevron

German West Africa
Officers

German other ranks

African other ranks

Footnotes

Bibliography
 Farwell, Byron. The Great War in Africa, 1914–1918. New York: W. W. Norton & Company. 1989. 
 Haupt, Werner. Deutschlands Schutzgebiete in Übersee 1884–1918 [Germany’s Overseas Protectorates 1884-1918]. Friedberg: Podzun-Pallas Verlag. 1984. 
 Hoyt, Edwin P. Guerilla. Colonel von Lettow-Vorbeck and Germany's East African Empire. New York: Macmillan Publishing Co., Inc. 1981; and London: Collier Macmillan Publishers. 1981. .
 Miller, Charles. Battle for the Bundu: The First World War in German East Africa. London: Macdonald & Jane's, 1974; and New York: Macmillan Publishing Co., Inc. 1974. .

Literature
 German Colonial Encyclopaedia, 1920, Volume III, p. 321ff.
 Kopf, Werner. The German colonial force 1889/1918, Dörfler Publishing House
 Morlang, Thomas. Askari und Fitafita. Farbige Söldner in den deutsche Kolonien. Berlin 2008
 Reith, Wolfgang. The Command Authorities of the Imperial Colonial Force in the Homeland. German Soldier Yearbook 2000 and 2001 (2 parts). Munich: Signal Publishing House.

External links
 German Colonial Uniforms
 A German language naval and military history site
German language sites:
 Protection and Overseas Troops
 Mauerstraße 45/46: The Oberkommando der Schutztruppen (Africa in Berlin – German History Museum)

German Army (German Empire)
People of former German colonies
Military history of German East Africa
German words and phrases
Colonial troops